The 1902 Home Nations Championship was the twentieth series of the rugby union Home Nations Championship. Six matches were played between 11 January and 15 March. It was contested by England, Ireland, Scotland and Wales.

Wales won both the Championship and the Triple Crown, both for the third time in the country's history. After winning the Triple Crown the year before, Scotland disappointed by losing all three games of the 1902 tournament.

Table

Results

Scoring system
The matches for this season were decided on points scored. A try was worth three points, while converting a kicked goal from the try gave an additional two points. A dropped goal and a goal from mark were both worth four points. Penalty goals were worth three points.

The matches

England vs. Wales

England: HT Gamlin (Blackheath), Philip Nicholas (Exeter), John Raphael (Oxford Uni.), JT Taylor (West Hartlepool), SF Coopper (Blackheath), B Oughtred (Hartlepool Rovers), PD Kendall (Birkenhead Park), G Fraser (Richmond), JJ Robinson (Headingley), TH Willcocks (Plymouth Albion), LR Tosswill (Exeter), H Alexander (Birkenhead Park) capt., Denys Dobson (Oxford Uni.), J Jewitt (Hartlepool Rovers), SG Williams (Devonport Albion)

Wales: John Strand-Jones (Llanelli), Willie Llewellyn (Llwynypia), Gwyn Nicholls (Cardiff) capt., Rhys Gabe (Llanelli), Teddy Morgan (London Welsh), Dicky Owen (Swansea), Dick Jones (Swansea), Jehoida Hodges (Newport), Will Joseph (Swansea), Will Osborne (Mountain Ash), Arthur Harding (Cardiff), Alfred Brice (Aberavon), David Jones (Treherbert), George Boots (Newport), Nathaniel Walters (Llanelli)

Wales vs. Scotland

Wales: John Strand-Jones (Llanelli), Willie Llewellyn (Llwynypia), Gwyn Nicholls (Cardiff) capt., Rhys Gabe (Llanelli), Teddy Morgan (London Welsh), Dicky Owen (Swansea), Llewellyn Lloyd (Newport), Jehoida Hodges (Newport), Will Joseph (Swansea), Will Osborne (Mountain Ash), Arthur Harding (Cardiff), Alfred Brice (Aberavon), David Jones (Treherbert), George Boots (Newport), Harry Jones (Penygraig)

Scotland: AW Duncan (Edinburgh University), WH Welsh (Edinburgh Acads), AN Fell (Edinburgh University), Alec Boswell Timms  (Edinburgh University), P Turnbull (Edinburgh Acads), FH Fasson (Edinburgh University), Jimmy Gillespie (Edinburgh Acads), J Ross (London Scottish), AB Flett (Edinburgh University), WE Kyle (Hawick), David Bedell-Sivright (Cambridge Uni), Mark Coxon Morrison  (Royal HSFP) capt., JV Beddell-Sivright (Cambridge Uni), James Greenlees (Cambridge Uni), JA Bell (Clydesdale)

England vs. Ireland

England: HT Gamlin (Blackheath), R Forrest (Blackheath), John Raphael (Oxford Uni.), JT Taylor (West Hartlepool), SF Coopper (Blackheath), B Oughtred (Hartlepool Rovers), Ernest John "Katie" Walton (Castleford), G Fraser (Richmond), JJ Robinson (Headingley), John Daniell (Richmond) capt., LR Tosswill (Exeter), H Alexander (Birkenhead Park), Denys Dobson (Oxford Uni.), PF Hardwick (Percy Park), SG Williams (Devonport Albion)

Ireland: J Fulton (NIFC) capt., CC Fitzgerald (Glasgow University), BRW Doran (Lansdowne), JB Allison (Queen's Uni, Belfast), IG Davidson (NIFC), Louis Magee (Bective Rangers), Harry Corley (Dublin University), Thomas Arnold Harvey (Dublin University), GT Hamlet (Old Wesley), Samuel Irwin (Queen's Uni, Belfast), A Tedford (Malone), P Healey (Limerick), JJ Coffey (Lansdowne), F Gardiner (NIFC), J Ryan (Rockwell College)

Ireland vs. Scotland

Ireland: J Fulton (NIFC) capt., Gerry Doran (Lansdowne), BRW Doran (Lansdowne), JB Allison (Queen's Uni, Belfast), IG Davidson (NIFC), Louis Magee (Bective Rangers), Harry Corley (Dublin University), Thomas Arnold Harvey (Dublin University), GT Hamlet (Old Wesley), Samuel Irwin (Queen's Uni, Belfast), A Tedford (Malone), P Healey (Limerick), JJ Coffey (Lansdowne), F Gardiner (NIFC), JC Pringle (NIFC)

Scotland: AW Duncan (Edinburgh University), WH Welsh (Edinburgh Acads), JE Crabbie (Oxford University), AS Dryborough (Edinburgh Wanderers), P Turnbull (Edinburgh Acads), RM Neill (Edinburgh Acads), Jimmy Gillespie (Edinburgh Acads), Herbert Bullmore (Edinburgh University), AB Flett (Edinburgh University), WE Kyle (Hawick), David Bedell-Sivright (Cambridge Uni), Mark Coxon Morrison  (Royal HSFP) capt., WP Scott (West of Scotland), James Greenlees (Cambridge Uni), JA Bell (Clydesdale)

Ireland vs. Wales

Ireland: J Fulton (NIFC), Gerry Doran (Lansdowne), BRW Doran (Lansdowne), JB Allison (Queen's Uni, Belfast), IG Davidson (NIFC), Louis Magee (Bective Rangers) capt., Harry Corley (Dublin University), Thomas Arnold Harvey (Dublin University), GT Hamlet (Old Wesley), Samuel Irwin (Queen's Uni, Belfast), A Tedford (Malone), P Healey (Limerick), JJ Coffey (Lansdowne), F Gardiner (NIFC), JC Pringle (NIFC)

Wales: John Strand-Jones (Llanelli), Willie Llewellyn (Llwynypia), Gwyn Nicholls (Cardiff) capt., Rhys Gabe (Llanelli), Teddy Morgan (London Welsh), Dicky Owen (Swansea), Llewellyn Lloyd (Newport), Jehoida Hodges (Newport), Will Joseph (Swansea), Will Osborne (Mountain Ash), Arthur Harding (Cardiff), Alfred Brice (Aberavon), David Jones (Treherbert), George Boots (Newport), Harry Jones (Penygraig)

Scotland vs. England

Scotland: AW Duncan (Edinburgh University), WH Welsh (Edinburgh Acads), AN Fell (Edinburgh University), Alec Boswell Timms (Edinburgh University), P Turnbull (Edinburgh Acads), FH Fasson (Edinburgh University), ED Simson (Edinburgh University), John Dykes (Glasgow HSFP), HO Smith (Watsonians), WE Kyle (Hawick), David Bedell-Sivright (Cambridge Uni), Mark Coxon Morrison  (Royal HSFP) capt., WP Scott (West of Scotland), James Greenlees (Cambridge Uni), JA Bell (Clydesdale)

England: HT Gamlin (Blackheath), R Forrest (Blackheath), John Raphael (Oxford Uni.), JT Taylor (West Hartlepool), T Simpson (Rockcliff), B Oughtred (Hartlepool Rovers), Ernest John Walton (Castleford), G Fraser (Richmond), JJ Robinson (Headingley), John Daniell (Richmond) capt., LR Tosswill (Exeter), Bernard Charles Hartley (Blackheath), Denys Dobson (Oxford Uni.), PF Hardwick (Percy Park), SG Williams (Devonport Albion)

Bibliography

External links

1900–01
1901–02 in British rugby union
1901–02 in English rugby union
rugby union
rugby union
Home Nations Championship
Home Nations Championship
Home Nations Championship
1901–02 in Scottish rugby union